Chuquicamata (referred to as Chuqui for short) is the largest open pit copper mine in terms of excavated volume in the world. Flotation and smelting facilities were installed in 1952, and expansion of the refining facilities in 1968 made 500,000 tons annual copper production possible in the late 1970s. Previously part of Anaconda Copper, the mine is now owned and operated by Codelco, a Chilean state enterprise, since the Chilean nationalization of copper in the late 1960s and early 1970s. Its depth of  makes it the second deepest open-pit mine in the world, after Bingham Canyon Mine in Utah, United States.

Etymology
There are several versions of the meaning of Chuquicamata. The most widely known seems to be that it means the limit (camata) of the land of the Chucos (chuqui). Another interpretation is that it means metal (chuqui) tipped wooden (camata) spear. A third interpretation is that it means the distance (camata) that a spear (chuqui) was thrown by an Atacameño to determine the size of the copper orebody that a god intended to give him. Yet, another theory is that it means 'Pico de Oro' or 'Peak of Gold'.

History
Incas and Spanish explorers exploited the mineral deposits of Chuquicamata during the pre-colonial and colonial periods, and Chilean and English companies mined the brochantite veins from 1879 to 1912. The opencast was the biggest pit in the world during the 1990s, but has since been surpassed by the Escondida mine, which is now the world's largest producing mine, with 750,000 metric tons of annual productions (5.6% of the world's production in 2000). Copper has been mined for centuries at Chuquicamata, as evidenced by the 1899 discovery of the "Copper Man," a mummy dated to  550 A.D. The mummy was found in an ancient mine shaft, apparently trapped by a rockfall— It is also related that Pedro de Valdivia obtained copper horseshoes from the natives when he passed through in the early 16th century.

Mining activity was relatively small scale until the War of the Pacific, when Chile annexed parts of both Peru and Bolivia, including Chuquicamata. At this time, a great influx of miners were drawn into the area by what was termed the 'Red Gold Fever' (La Fiebre del Oro Rojo). Soon, Chuquicamata was covered with mines and over 400 mining claims at one point. 

It was a wild and disorganized camp. Title claims were often in doubt due to the defective 1873 Mining Code and matters were further complicated after the capture of Calama during the 1891 Chilean Civil War when rebels confiscated mines belonging to loyalists. Many miners lived in makeshift and lawless shanty towns around the mines, including Punta de Rieles, Placilla, and Banco Drummond. These settlements provided miners with alcohol, gambling, and prostitution and murder was an almost daily occurrence. The army had to be sent in to maintain order as late as 1918. The towns were eventually buried under the waste dumps to east of the mine.

These early operations mined high grade veins like the Zaragoza and Balmaceda veins, which contained concentrations of up to 10-15% copper, leaving low grade disseminated ore. One attempt was made to process the low-grade ore in 1899-1900 by Norman Walker, a partner in La Compañia de Cobres de Antofagasta, but the attempt failed, leaving the company deeply in debt. Mining was never really fully developed at this time because of a lack of water, isolation, difficulty communicating, lack of capital, and fluctuations in the copper price. Nevertheless, larger mining companies eventually emerged, organized as commercial companies rather than mining operations to work around problems with the mining code. These companies started to buy up and consolidate small mines and claims. In 1951, a young Che Guevara documented visiting the mine with Alberto Granado in his memoir The Motorcycle Diaries, describing it as "[...] a scene from a modern drama. You cannot say that it's lacking in beauty, but it is a beauty without grace, imposing and glacial."

Modern mine

The modern era started when an American engineer named Bradley finally developed a method of processing low-grade oxidized copper ores. In 1910 he approached the lawyer and industrialist Albert C Burrage, who sent engineers to examine Chuquicamata. This was the beginning of copper mining by the Chile Exploration Company of the Guggenheim Group. Their reports found that the mine showed promise, and in April 1911, he started to buy up mines and claims, mainly from the larger mining companies, in association with Duncan Fox y Cia., an English entrepreneur.

Since Burrage did not have the capital to develop a mine, he approached the Guggenheim Brothers. They examined his claims and estimated the reserves at 690 million tonnes of 2.58% grade copper. The Guggenheims also had discovered a process for treating the low grade ores developed by Elias Anton Cappelen Smith and were immediately interested. They organised the Chile Exploration Company (Chilex) in January 1912 and eventually bought out Burrage for US$25 million (or $ million today) in Chile's stock market. E. A. Cappelen Smith, consulting metallurgist for M. Guggenheim's Sons, worked out the first process for the treatment of Chuquicamata copper oxide ore around 1913 and led a team of engineers operating a pilot plant in Perth Amboy, New Jersey for a year.

Chile then went ahead with the development and construction of a mine on the eastern section of the Chuquicamata field, gradually expanding it to include the rest of the field over the next 15 years. A leaching plant was planned with a capacity to produce 50,000 tons of electrolytic copper annually. Among the equipment purchased were steam shovels from the Panama Canal. A port and an oil-fired power plant were built at Tocopilla,  to the West and an aqueduct was constructed to bring water in from the Andes. Production started on May 18, 1915. Production rose from 4,345 tonnes in the first year to 50,400 tonnes in 1920. The Guggenheims sold the mine to Anaconda Copper in 1923, and production increased to 135,890 tonnes by 1929 before the Great Depression hit and demand fell.

For many years, production came from the oxidized capping of the orebody, which only required leaching and then electrowinning the copper, but by 1951 the oxidized reserves were primarily exhausted. The company then built a mill, flotation plant and smelter to treat the enormous reserves of underlying supergene copper sulfides. These secondary sulfides arise from the leaching of the overlying ore and its re-deposition and replacement of the deeper primary (hypogene) sulfides.

In 1957 the Exotica deposit (South Mine) was discovered beneath tailings, and turned out to be the largest known deposit of exotic copper. This led Anaconda to build an oxide plant, concentrator, smelter, refinery, and town next to the mine, as well as a power plant in Tocopilla. 

In 1971, the mine was nationalized and operations were then assumed by CODELCO.

For many years it was the mine with the largest annual production in the world but was recently overtaken by Minera Escondida. Nevertheless, it remained by far the mine with the largest total production (approximately 29 million tonnes) of copper until the end of 2007 (excluding Radomiro Tomić). Despite over 90 years of intensive exploitation, it remains one of the largest known copper resources. Chuquicamata is also a significant producer of molybdenum.

Chuquicamata is now amalgamated with the currently operational Radomiro Tomić mine to the north (on the same mineralized system), the still under development Alejandro Hales mine to the south (formerly Mansa Mina) and the recently discovered 'Toki cluster' of copper porphyries to form the "'Codelco Norte'" division of Codelco.

Geology
Chuquicamata belongs to the broad class of porphyry copper deposits. Practically, the entire Chuquicamata orebody is hosted by the Chuqui Porphyry Complex, made up of East, Fine Texture, West and Banco porphyries. These Cu-Mo porphyry systems formed during the Eocene-Oligocene and exhibit classic "zoned alteration-mineralization features. A regional fault zone gave rise to hydrothermal activity which concentrated metal and sulfide minerals. The West Fault is a major fault that separates Chuquicamata into western and eastern parts. This fault is part of the Cenozoic West Fault System in Chile, extending several hundred kilometers in a general north-south to northeast strike direction. The Chuqui Porphyry Complex lies in the mineralized east part of the pit. In contrast, the barren Fortuna Complex lies in the west part.

A large proportion of the copper at Chuquicamata occurs in veins and veinlets filling faults and fault-related shatter zones. Pyrite is present everywhere, and chalcocite and covellite appears as both supergene and hypogene minerals. Molybdenite is conspicuous at Chuquicamata, almost all of it carried by quartz veins.

Economic effects

Copper mining has long been the most consistent Chilean export, and currently accounts for almost one-third of all foreign trade, down from a peak of almost 75%.

Copper has been mined in the land area between central Chile and southern Peru since the colonial period, but it was not until the 20th century that copper reached the same level of importance as other mineral exports such as saltpeter or silver. Before World War I, saltpeter was collected from abundant deposits of caliche in the Atacama Desert, and Chile was the primary source of nitrates in the world.  After the war, the world market for saltpeter, Chile's main export at the time, collapsed because of the production of artificial nitrates, first synthesized in Germany through a combination of the Haber process and the Ostwald process. As a result, Chile's economy shifted toward dependence on the copper industry. During this period, copper was described as "Chile's salary".

By the late 1950s, the three largest copper mines in Chile were Chuquicamata, El Salvador mine, and El Teniente. Chuquicamata and El Salvador were owned and operated by the Anaconda Copper Company. These mines gave rise to largely self-contained and self-sustaining settlements, complete with housing for workers, water and electrical plants, schools, stores, railways, and police forces.

In 1971, Chile's newly elected president Salvador Allende nationalized the Chuquicamata mine. Anaconda lost two-thirds of its copper production. After the Chilean military overthrew Allende in a CIA-backed coup in 1973, the new military government paid Anaconda $250 million in compensation.

See also
 Escondida
 Chanarcillo
 El Salvador mine
 El Teniente
 Los Pelambres mine
 Potrerillos, Chile
 Chilean nationalization of copper
 Geology of Chile
 Mir mine

References

Further reading

External links

 Imágenes 3D en Google
 Codelco Chile - Chuquicamata info
 Chuqui: The Life and Death of a Mining Town - Documentary video about the last days of the town of Chuquicamata
 
 </ref>

Anaconda Copper
Atacama Desert
Copper mines in Chile
Geological type localities
Mines in Antofagasta Region
Open-pit mines
Surface mines in Chile